Gholamreza Takhti (Persian: غلامرضا تختی) is a 2019 Iranian biographical drama film directed by Bahram Tavakoli and written by Saeid Malekan about Gholamreza Takhti. The film screened for the first time at the 37th Fajr Film Festival and was released on March 16, 2019 in Iran theatrically.

Cast 
Mohsen Takhti as Gholamreza Takhti
Mohammad Reza Alimardani as Gholamreza Takhti's voice 
Amirreza Faramarzi as child Gholamreza Takhti
Alireza Goudarzi as young Gholamreza Takhti
Shahrokh Shahbazi as old Gholamreza Takhti
 Mahoor Alvand as Leili
 Behnoosh Tabatabei as Shahla Tavakoli
 Atila Pesyani as Haj Fe'li
 Farhad Aeesh as Mohammad Mosadegh
 Hamid Reza Azarang as Taleghani
 Shirin Yazdanbakhsh as Hotel's chef
 Parivash Nazarieh as Ahmad's mother
 Siavosh Tahmoures as Takhti's coach
 Setareh Pesyani as Hotel's servant
 Mojtaba Pirzadeh as Takhti's friend
 Mohammad Valizadegan as Takhti's friend
 Banipal Shoomoon as Takhti's friend
 Masoumeh Ghasemipour as Takhti's mother
 Morteza Rostami as Takhti's father
 Yadollah Shademani as Neighbor
 Mehdi Ghorbani as Takhti's fan

Reception

Awards and nominations

References

External links 
 

Wrestling films
Iranian biographical films
2010s Persian-language films
2019 drama films
2010s biographical drama films